Pebbles, Volume 7 is a compilation album among the CDs in the Pebbles series; it is subtitled Chicago 2.   The previous CD in the series, Pebbles, Volume 6 also features bands from Chicago, as does the LP Highs in the Mid-Sixties, Volume 4.

Release data

This album was released on AIP Records in 1994 as #AIP-CD-5024.  Despite the similar catalogue number, there is no relation between the tracks on this CD and the tracks on the corresponding LP.

Notes on the tracks

The Ides of March had a hit song with "Vehicle", and another of their early songs, "Roller Coaster" was included on the Pebbles, Volume 10 LP. The Cryan Shames had a regional Midwest hit with "Sugar and Spice" that reached No.49 on the national charts; this cut is the flip side. Gary and the Knight Lites is just one of many similar band names (including Gary and the Nite Lites, the Light Nites, and the Knight Lights) used by this multi-racial band before renaming themselves the American Breed and hitting pay dirt with "Bend Me, Shape Me" in 1968. The better-known "A" side of the single by the Foggy Notions, "Need a Little Lovin'" is included on the Pebbles, Volume 6 CD. Bruce Mattey of the Revelles later joined New Colony Six, while Freddie Glickstein of this band was also in the Flock.  The final cut is a cover by a popular Chicago DJ of the time of one of the strangest hit songs of the 1960s, originally released by the Hombres.

Liner notes

Besides information on the bands and specific tracks on the album, the liner notes for this album include an essay by Jeff Lind on Chicago Rock.

Track listing

 The Lost Agency: "One Girl Man"; Rel. 1967
 The Foggy Notions: "Take Me Back & Hold Me"; Rel. 1966
 The Boyz: "Come with Me"; Rel. 1966*
 The Revelles: "Little Girl" by B.Mattey; Rel. 1966
 Oscar and the Majestics: "I Can't Explain"; Rel. 1966
 The Trolls: "Every Day & Every Night"; Rel. 1966
 The Children of Darkness: "Sugar Shack a Go Go"; Rel. 1966
 The Factory: "High Blood Pressure"; Rel. 1969
 Rudy Von Ruden: "Spider & the Fly, The"; Rel. 1970 (?)
 The Ides of March: "I'll Keep Searching"; Rel. 1966
 Gary and the Knight Lites: "Take Me Back"; Rel. 1965 (?)
 Bobby Brelyn: "Hanna"; Rel. 1966 (?)
 The Commons, Ltd.: "I'm Gonna Change the World"; Rel. 1965 (?)
 Lord and the Flies: "Echoes"; Rel. 1967
 The Berries: "What in the World"; Rel. 1965 (?)
 The Vectors: "It's Been a Day or Two"; Rel. 1964
 The Malibus: "I'm Cryin'"; Rel. 1965
 The Cardinals: "Go Go Baby"; Rel. 1966
 Wet Paint: "Shame"; Rel. 1966
 Wet Paint: "At the River's Edge"; Rel. 1967
 Jimmy Null and the Inversions: "I Still Care for You"; Rel. 1967
 The Lost Agency: "Time to Dream"; Rel. 1967
 Barney Pip: "Let It All Hang Out"; Rel. 1967

Note: The back tray card and liner notes of the CD incorrectly list "Ben Franklin's Almanac" by the Cryan Shames as the third track on this CD.

Pebbles (series) albums
1994 compilation albums